A list of films produced by the Israeli film industry in 1967.

1967 releases

Notable deaths
Ben Oyserman

See also
1967 in Israel

References

External links
 Israeli films of 1967 at the Internet Movie Database

Israeli
Film
1967